Zambia competed at the 2019 African Games held from 19 to 31 August 2019 in Rabat, Morocco. In total, athletes representing Zambia won one gold medal, one silver medal and three bronze medals and the country finished in 24th place in the medal table.

Medal summary

Medal table

|  style="text-align:left; width:78%; vertical-align:top;"|

|  style="text-align:left; width:22%; vertical-align:top;"|

Athletics 

Eight athletes competed in athletics: Lumeka Katundu, Luchembe Kennedy, Hellen Makumba, Agness Mazala, Daniel Mbewe, Suwilanji Theresa Fotwe Mpondela, Rhodah Njobvu and Sydney Siame.

Sydney Siame won the gold medal in the men's 200 metres event.

Luchembe Kennedy competed in the men's 400 metres event. He qualified in the heats to compete in the semifinals.

Hellen Makumba competed in the women's 100 metres and women's 4 × 100 metres relay events. In the 100 metres event she qualified to compete in the semifinals.

Agness Mazala also competed in the women's 100 metres event. She did not qualify to compete in the semifinals.

Badminton 

Zambia competed in badminton with four players. Kalombo Mulenga won the bronze medal in the men's singles event.

Boxing 

Five athletes were scheduled to compete in boxing: Ben Banda, Mbachi Kaonga, Everisto Mulenga, Benny Sichuundu Muziyo and Nkumbu Silungwe.

Everisto Mulenga won the bronze medal in the men's featherweight (57kg) event.

Chess 

Stanley Boston Chumfwa, Anndrew Kalenda Kayonde, Mwangala Linah Mululu and Makumba Lorita Mwango competed in chess.

Mwango won the silver medal in the women's rapid individual event.

Equestrian 

Ariana Frances Barclay Castle, Diana Dakik, Amber Estelle Homles and Anna Bunty Howard competed in equestrian.

Castle competed in the individual jumping event and Dakik, Homles and Howard competed in both the individual jumping and team jumping events.

Football 

Zambia's women's national football team was scheduled to compete in the women's tournament but withdrew and did not compete in their scheduled matches.

Handball 

Zambia's national handball team competed in the men's tournament. They were eliminated in the quarterfinals by Angola.

Judo 

Five athletes represented Zambia in judo: Andrew Sande Kaswanga, Steven Mung'andu, Mathew Mwango, Taonga Soko and Simon Zulu.

Swimming 

Four athletes represented Zambia in swimming:

Men

Women

Mixed

References 

Nations at the 2019 African Games
2019
African Games